Alberto Faya (born 1944) is a Cuban singer, researcher, composer, and professor of music.

Biography 
Faya gives lectures relating to Cuban history, culture, and music. He holds a degree from the University of Havana and is a professor of musical culture at the university.

During the 1970s, Faya was one of a number of Cuban musicians who worked to better incorporate African and Afro-Cuban music in Cuban society; according to his accounts, he had to right vigorously to air Afro-Cuban rumba music on Cuban radio stations. Faya is a believer in the ongoing melding of different cultures, and considers culture as the primary means by which personal identity is derived. Faya is a self-proclaimed Afrocentrist, as he finds that his musical background most defines his understanding of culture and identity.

References 

1944 births
Living people
Cuban male singers
Cuban composers
Male composers
Cuban male musicians